Killer is a Belgian heavy metal band founded in 1980. The lead guitarist is Paul Shorty Van Camp. Initially, they played hard rock, but later began to weigh down their sound in favor of traditional heavy metal, speed metal and power metal.

History
Killer was founded in 1980 by Paul "Shorty" Van Camp (lead guitar and lead vocals) and "Fat Leo" (drums), who had just split up their previous band, Mothers of Track. After a few auditions "Spooky" (bass guitar and lead vocals) joined the band. They decided to stay a power trio and started working on the songs. After four months, their first record, Ready for Hell, was recorded and released by major company WEA (Warner Bros). After this release Killer knew a very fast evolution and became a well respected and major band all over Europe and even abroad. Killer was managed and advised by Alfie Falkenbach, Leo Felsenstein and Stonne Holmgren, who later founded Mausoleum, one of the first independent heavy metal labels. Killer was the first Belgian metal band inspired by the success of the NWOBHM bands such as Saxon, Iron Maiden, and Def Leppard.

Due to the trio formula, the rough voices, speedy uptempos, and double bass drums, Killer was always compared with Motorhead. This was more of an honour than an insult. Killer and Motorhead were speedy bands long before the existence of Metallica, so in a way, they were innovators in the early eighties. However, Killer was not punk, but always very melodic.

"Fat Leo" was more a rock and blues oriented drummer and at the end of 1981 he was replaced by double bassd rum monster "Double Bear".
 
In early 1982 a second album, Wall of Sound, was released on the Lark label and this was the international breakthrough of the band. Killer was a very energetic live band which resulted in a lot of touring and performances at several festivals in Europe.

Influenced by Killer, a lot of other Belgian bands came onto the scene, and Alfie and his companions decided to start up their own record company, Mausoleum. One of the first releases of this label was Killers' third album Shockwaves, which was a hit. They received excellent reviews from all European countries, and even in the US, Brazil and Japan the press was very positive. Mausoleum then launched new Belgian bands such as Ostrogoth, Crossfire, Danger, FN Guns, and Lions Pride. Wildfire (UK), and Faithful Breath (D).

In 1985, Killer recorded a double live album containing all their best hit songs and a few new compositions. The album was recorded with Dieter Dierks' (Scorpions) mobile studio in a sold out venue in Antwerp, in front of an outrageous crowd. During the last song more than 100 fans climbed on stage to sing along with the band. The release of this album would have definitely been the worldwide breakthrough of Killer. The album never saw daylight due to the financial problems of Mausoleum. The album's title would have been 'Still alive in eighty-five'. The artwork was finished, and the tapes were mixed but kept in the studio owner's safe due to financial and legal difficulties with Mausoleum. The label soon ceased to exist and everything was lost. They never succeeded to recover the finished tapes from the studio. This seemed to be the beginning of the end for Killer.

Another highlight in the career of Killer was the Poland tour in 1986. It was not so evident for a metal band to tour behind the Iron Curtain at the time, but they did it. Sold out venues (around 10,000 people every night) and an enthusiastic crowd kept the band alive for a few more months, but band members and crew were still very disappointed and discouraged because of the non-release of the live album. They felt blockaded in our evolution, and this caused the first split of the band in early 1987.

In 1987, Shorty released a solo album, Too Wild to Tame, under the name "Van Camp" at CNR records. This album was in the best Killer tradition but a lot more guitar hero oriented with long complicated songs and long flashing guitar solos.

In 1989, Spooky and Shorty decided to start Killer again, with new drummer Rudy Simmons and second guitar player Jan Van Springel.

A fourth album, Fatal Attraction, was recorded in Germany and released by the also re-formed Mausoleum label. In the beginning (1990) this album was only released in Germany, and the band operated and toured mostly in Germany. Later the album was also released in other countries.

A victim of the upcoming grunge-rock style and the general fall of melodic metal, Killer split for the second time in 1991.

Shorty and Spooky performed in a power blues band, Blues-Express from 1991 until 1993, but after some musical differences they both went their own way. In this period Killer did three reunion gigs with their new drummer vanne.

Shorty started a new classic rock-metal cover band, Blackjack, in 1995. This band still exists, are keeping the spirit of Killer alive.

Discography
 1981: Ready for Hell
 1982: Wall of Sound
 1984: Shock Waves
 1990: Fatal Attraction
 2003: Broken Silence
 2005: Immortal
 2015: Monsters Of Rock
 2023: Hellfire

References

External links 
 

Belgian heavy metal musical groups
Musical groups established in 1980